Le Sir George Simpson (also known as Sir George Simpson) is a condominium building located at 1485 Sherbrooke Street West in the Golden Square Mile district of Montreal, Quebec, Canada. The building started construction in 2006 and was completed in 2010. The Sir George Simpson project was developed by developer Rene Lépine Sr., head of Groupe Lépine.

During the pre-construction phase, Groupe Lépine allowed early customers to personalize unit sizes and floor plans. The building contains 31 units that range between 1,500 square feet to 6,300 square feet, with a facade of precast concrete.

Sir George Simpson houses the most expensive apartments in Quebec, with units selling for over $1,500 per square foot as of 2014 and was the first building in Montreal to sell for over $1,000 per square foot. In its pre-construction phase, units sold between $1 million and $5.2 million, further increasing costs to between $1.2 million and $7.2 million, and was exclusively represented by Sotheby's International Realty. The building officially sold out in 2011 at record prices.

In 2016, American actress Jennifer Lawrence lived in the building during the filming of a movie.

References

Residential buildings in Montreal
Downtown Montreal
Residential buildings completed in 2010
Residential condominiums in Canada